The Complete Peanuts is a series of books containing the entire run of Charles M. Schulz's long-running newspaper comic strip Peanuts, published by Fantagraphics Books. The series was published at a rate of two volumes per year, each containing two years of strips (except for the first volume, which includes 1950–1952). Slipcased sets of two volumes are also available. The series comprises a total of 26 volumes, including a final volume that was a collection of Schulz strips, cartoons, stories, and illustrations that appeared outside of the daily newspaper strip. These hardcover books were first published between 2004 and 2016. Later, Fantagraphics also began publishing the series in a softcover format. A companion series titled Peanuts Every Sunday, collecting only the Sunday strips of the Peanuts series, was launched by Fantagraphics in 2013 and is scheduled to run until late 2022.

Schulz began to discuss an anthology of his work with Fantagraphics in 1997. The idea of a complete compendium of all published Peanuts strips was long resisted by Schulz; he did not want some early strips reprinted, as he felt they were not as good as the ones he drew later in his career. Approximately 2,000 of the 17,897 strips had never appeared in a previous U.S. collection.

The first book in the series was published in April 2004 and topped the New York Times Best Seller List.

Volumes
Besides Schulz's work, each book contains an introduction by an influential individual (often with a connection to Schulz), an index of themes and characters, additional art by designer Seth (all of which are directly based on a specific Peanuts panel), and a biography of Schulz written by series editor Gary Groth. In addition, the first volume contains an interview with Schulz conducted by Groth and an extended biography. Sunday panels, which originally appeared in color, are presented in black and white in the series (a decision approved by Schulz's widow, Jean Schulz). The hardcover volumes measure  ×  while the softcover volumes are  × .

All the characters on the covers (and their styles) match the time period each volume represents.

Volume 25, covering the years 1999 and 2000, also includes the complete run of Schulz's 1947–50 strip Li'l Folks. This precursor includes early versions of Charlie Brown and Snoopy. A 26th and final volume was announced in 2016 which includes hundreds of miscellaneous sketches, designs, short stories, and covers drawn by Schulz.

Boxed sets
All of the volumes are also being released in boxed sets of two, housed in a specially designed slipcase.

Peanuts Every Sunday
Peanuts Every Sunday is a series featuring the Peanuts Sunday strips in full color. These books, unlike the Complete Peanuts series, are scheduled to be released one per year, in ten volumes covering half a decade each (except the first book, 1952–55). Slip-cased sets of two are also available.

Box sets

Both the complete series and the Sunday collections are being published in hardback and paperback form, with different covers and supplemental artwork.

Recognition
The Complete Peanuts have won several awards including:

Eisner Awards
2005 – "Best Archival Collection/Project"
2005 – "Best Publication Design" (Seth)
2007 – "Best Archival Collection/Project – Strips"

Harvey Awards
2005 – "Special Award for Excellence in Presentation"
2005 – "Best Domestic Reprint Project"
2007 – "Best Domestic Reprint Project"
2008 – "Best Domestic Reprint Project"
2009 – "Best Domestic Reprint Project"

International editions
All international editions retain the artwork, layout, and format of the original American version (though some of the German volumes feature the original introductions, such as those by Matt Groening and Whoopi Goldberg, while others feature new ones by Germans such as Robert Gernhardt). , the following have been printed:
 Canongate Books started publication of a U.K. edition of the series in October 2007, with all of the volumes published; Volume 5 features a different introduction from the U.S. edition, by Russell T. Davies.
 Carlsen Comics began publication of a German edition of The Complete Peanuts in October 2006, under the title Peanuts Werkausgabe. All of the volumes have been released.
 The Portuguese release of Peanuts – Obra Completa by Edições Afrontamento published the first two volumes in 2006, with the sixth released in 2011. There is no schedule for the publication of the following volumes.
 Dargaud started publishing The Complete Peanuts in France, under the title Snoopy – Intégrales, in November 2005; later volumes were re-titled Snoopy et les Peanuts. As of 2013, 17 volumes have been published.
 In Poland, Nasza Księgarnia began publishing the collected edition in 2008, under the title Fistaszki zebrane, with 21 volumes released so far and the last volume scheduled for a 2021 release.
 In Spain, Planeta DeAgostini is the publisher of Snoopy y Carlitos, with 18 volumes published as of 2013.
 In Brazil, L&PM Editores started publication in November 2009, under the title Peanuts Completo. Eight volumes have been released so far.
 In Italy, Panini Comics started publication in April 2005, maintaining the original title The Complete Peanuts. All of the volumes have been released.
 In China, Shaanxi Tourism Press Co. Ltd. first started a Chinese edition of The Complete Peanuts in October 2007. One volume (1950–1952) was published, and then the publication was stopped. Then, 21 Century Publishing Group started another Chinese edition of The Complete Peanuts in September 2009. Ten volumes (1950–1970) were published before the publication was stopped. Beijing Huawen Tianxia Changqingteng Books Issuance Co. Ltd. started a third Chinese edition of The Complete Peanuts in November 2015. Seventeen volumes (1950–1984) have been published so far, and more are expected to be coming.
In Greece, Kathimerini started publishing Peanuts Every Sunday, in January 2022. The Greek publisher kept everything the American version has. The only difference is that they decided to divide every volume in half. So, until now, five volumes (1950–1975) have been published.

References

External links

Peanuts (comic strip)
Comic strip collection books
Products introduced in 2004
Eisner Award winners
Harvey Award winners
Fantagraphics titles